Riina Ruismäki (born 11 March 2001) is a Finnish aesthetic group gymnast. She is a three-time (2018-2020) Finnish National champion in Aesthetic group gymnastics competing with Team Minetit. She is the 2017 AGG Junior World champion.

Career

She started competing in aesthetic group gymnastics in club Tapanilan Erä  with team Alexa. They won gold medals at the 2013 and 2014 Finnish National Championship in category 12-14 years. 

In 2015, she joined junior team Elite in cooperation of club Tapanilan Erä and Sport Club Vantaa. She attended her fist Challenge Cup, where they finished 4th in Junior category, only 0,45 points away from podium. They won bronze medal at Finnish National Championship in junior category the same year. Later, they competed at the 2015 Junior World Championships in Tórshavn, Faroe Islands. Team ended on 7th place in Preliminaries and did not advance into the finals due to 2 teams per country rule. 

In 2016, they competed at three Challenge Cup events: in Estonia, Bulgaria and Spain. They won bronze medal again at Finnish National Championship in junior category and qualified to the 2016 Junior World Championships in Brno, Czech Republic. The team fall apart in autumn that year. 

In 2017, Riina and some members of Elite Junior team formed a co-operation team with the Minetit Juniors of Tampereen Voimistelijat called Minetit Elite. They won gold medals at Challenge Cups in Tartu and Padua. On national level, they became the 2017 Finnish Junior National champions. They also won gold medal at the 2017 Junior World Championships in Helsinki, Finland.

In summer she stepped into the senior category and joined senior team Minetit. They won silver medals at World Cup Chicago and at the 2017 European Championships in Sofia, Bulgaria. They kept the autumn program for spring season in 2018.

Next year, they won gold medal at World Cup Vantaa and silver at World Cup Graz. They also won silver medal at the 2018 World Championships in Budapest, Hungary.

References 

2001 births
Living people
Finnish gymnasts
Sportspeople from Helsinki